mHealth (also written as m-health or mhealth) is an abbreviation for mobile health, a term used for the practice of medicine and public health supported by mobile devices. The term is most commonly used in reference to using mobile communication devices, such as mobile phones, tablet computers and personal digital assistants (PDAs), and wearable devices such as smart watches, for health services, information, and data collection. The mHealth field has emerged as a sub-segment of eHealth, the use of information and communication technology (ICT), such as computers, mobile phones, communications satellite, patient monitors, etc., for health services and information. mHealth applications include the use of mobile devices in collecting community and clinical health data, delivery/sharing of healthcare information for practitioners, researchers and patients, real-time monitoring of patient vital signs, the direct provision of care (via mobile telemedicine) as well as training and collaboration of health workers.

In 2019, the global market for mHealth apps was estimated at US$17.92 billion, with a compound annual growth rate of 45% predicted from 2020 to 2027. While mHealth has application for industrialized nations, the field has emerged in recent years as largely an application for developing countries, stemming from the rapid rise of mobile phone penetration in low-income nations. The field, then, largely emerges as a means of providing greater access to larger segments of a population in developing countries, as well as improving the capacity of health systems in such countries to provide quality healthcare.
Within the mHealth space, projects operate with a variety of objectives, including increased access to healthcare and health-related information (particularly for hard-to-reach populations); improved ability to diagnose and track diseases; timelier, more actionable public health information; and expanded access to ongoing medical education and training for health workers.

Definitions

mHealth broadly encompasses the use of mobile telecommunication and multimedia technologies as they are integrated within increasingly mobile and wireless health care delivery systems. The field broadly encompasses the use of mobile telecommunication and multimedia technologies in health care delivery. The term mHealth was coined by Robert Istepanian as use of "emerging mobile communications and network technologies for healthcare".
A definition used at the 2010 mHealth Summit of the Foundation for the National Institutes of Health (FNIH) was "the delivery of healthcare services via mobile communication devices". The GSM Association representing the worldwide mobile communications industry published a report on mHealth in 2010 describing a new vision for healthcare and identified ways in which mobile technology might play a role in innovating healthcare delivery systems and healthcare system cost management.

While there are some projects that are considered solely within the field of mHealth, the linkage between mHealth and eHealth is unquestionable. For example, an mHealth project that uses mobile phones to access data on HIV/AIDS rates would require an eHealth system in order to manage, store, and assess the data. Thus, eHealth projects many times operate as the backbone of mHealth projects.

In a similar vein, while not clearly bifurcated by such a definition, eHealth can largely be viewed as technology that supports the functions and delivery of healthcare, while mHealth rests largely on providing healthcare access. Because mHealth is by definition based on mobile technology such as smartphones, healthcare, through information and delivery, can better reach areas, people, and/or healthcare practitioners with previously limited exposure to certain aspects of healthcare. The National Institute for Health and Care Research (NIHR) has published a review of research on how mHealth and digital health technologies can help manage health conditions.

Medical uses 
mHealth apps are designed to support diagnostic procedures, to aid physician decision-making for treatments, and to advance disease-related education for physicians and people under treatment. Mobile health has much potential in medicine and, if used in conjunction with human factors may improve access to care, the scope, and quality of health care services that can be provided. Some applications of mobile health may also improve the ability to improve accountability in healthcare and improve continuum of care by connecting interdisciplinary team members.

mHealth is one aspect of eHealth that is pushing the limits of how to acquire, transport, store, process, and secure the raw and processed data to deliver meaningful results. mHealth offers the ability of remote individuals to participate in the health care value matrix, which may not have been possible in the past. Participation does not imply just consumption of health care services. In many cases remote users are valuable contributors to gather data regarding disease and public health concerns such as outdoor pollution, drugs and violence.

While others exist, the 2009 UN Foundation and Vodafone Foundation report presents seven application categories within the mHealth field:
Education and awareness
Helpline
Diagnostic and treatment support
Communication and training for healthcare workers
Disease and epidemic outbreak tracking
Remote monitoring
Remote data collection

Education and awareness
Education and awareness programs within the mHealth field are largely about the spreading of mass information from source to recipient through short message services (SMS). In education and awareness applications, SMS messages are sent directly to users' phones to offer information about various subjects, including testing and treatment methods, availability of health services, and disease management. SMSs provide an advantage of being relatively unobtrusive, offering patients confidentiality in environments where disease (especially HIV/AIDS) is often taboo. Additionally, SMSs provide an avenue to reach far-reaching areas—such as rural areas—which may have limited access to public health information and education, health clinics, and a deficit of healthcare workers.

Helpline
Helpline typically consists of a specific phone number that any individual is able to call to gain access to a range of medical services. These include phone consultations, counseling, service complaints, and information on facilities, drugs, equipment, and/or available mobile health clinics.

Diagnostic support, treatment support, communication and training for healthcare workers
Diagnostic and treatment support systems are typically designed to provide healthcare workers in remote areas advice about diagnosis and treatment of patients. While some projects may provide mobile phone applications—such as a step-by-step medical decision tree systems—to help healthcare workers diagnose, other projects provide direct diagnosis to patients themselves. In such cases, known as telemedicine, patients might take a photograph of a wound or illness and allow a remote physician to diagnose to help treat the medical problem. Both diagnosis and treatment support projects attempt to mitigate the cost and time of travel for patients located in remote areas.

mHealth projects within the communication and training for healthcare workers subset involve connecting healthcare workers to sources of information through their mobile phone. This involves connecting healthcare workers to other healthcare workers, medical institutions, ministries of health, or other houses of medical information. Such projects additionally involve using mobile phones to better organize and target in-person training. Improved communication projects attempt to increase knowledge transfer amongst healthcare workers and improve patient outcomes through such programs as patient referral processes. For example, the systematic use of mobile instant messaging for the training and empowerment of health professionals has resulted in higher levels of clinical knowledge and fewer feelings of professional isolation.

Disease surveillance, remote data collection, and epidemic outbreak tracking
Projects within this area operate to utilize mobile phones' ability to collect and transmit data quickly, cheaply, and relatively efficiently. Data concerning the location and levels of specific diseases (such as malaria, HIV/AIDS, TB, Avian Flu) can help medical systems or ministries of health or other organizations identify outbreaks and better target medical resources to areas of greatest need. Such projects can be particularly useful during emergencies, in order to identify where the greatest medical needs are within a country

Policymakers and health providers at the national, district, and community level need accurate data in order to gauge the effectiveness of existing policies and programs and shape new ones. In the developing world, collecting field information is particularly difficult since many segments of the population are rarely able to visit a hospital, even in the case of severe illness. A lack of patient data creates an arduous environment in which policy makers can decide where and how to spend their (sometimes limited) resources. While some software within this area is specific to a particular content or area, other software can be adapted to any data collection purpose.

Treatment support and medication compliance for patients
Remote monitoring and treatment support allows for greater involvement in the continued care of patients. Recent studies seem to show also the efficacy of inducing positive and negative affective states, using smart phones. Within environments of limited resources and beds—and subsequently a 'outpatient' culture—remote monitoring allows healthcare workers to better track patient conditions, medication regimen adherence, and follow-up scheduling. Such projects can operate through either one- or two-way communications systems. Remote monitoring has been used particularly in the area of medication adherence for AIDS, cardiovascular disease, chronic lung disease,  diabetes, antenatal mental health, mild anxiety, and tuberculosis. Technical process evaluations have confirmed the feasibility of deploying dynamically tailored, SMS-based interventions designed to provide ongoing behavioral reinforcement for persons living with HIV. among others. Specific mobile applications might also support adherence to taking medications.

In conclusion, the use of mobile phone  technology (in combination with a web-based interface) in health care results in an increase in convenience and efficiency of data collection, transfer, storage and analysis management of data as compared with paper-based systems. Formal studies and preliminary project assessments demonstrate this improvement of efficiency of healthcare delivery by mobile technology. Nevertheless, mHealth should not be considered as a panacea for healthcare. Possible organizational issues include the ensuring of appropriate use and proper care of the handset, lost or stolen phones, and the important consideration of costs related to the purchase of equipment. There is therefore a difficulty in comparison in weighing up mHealth interventions against other priority and evidence-based interventions.

Criticism and concerns
The extensive practice of mhealth research has sparked criticism, for example on the proliferation of fragmented pilot studies in low- and middle-income countries, which is also referred to as "pilotitis." The extent of un-coordinated pilot studies prompted for instance the Ugandan Director General Health Services Dr Jane Ruth Aceng in 2012 to issue a notice that, "in order to jointly ensure that all eHealth efforts are harmonized and coordinated, I am directing that ALL eHealth projects/Initiatives be put to halt." The assumptions that justify mhealth initiatives have also been challenged in recent sociological research. For example, mobile phones have been argued to be less widely accessible and usable than is often portrayed in mhealth-related publications; people integrate mobile phones into their health behavior without external intervention; and the spread of mobile phones in low- and middle-income countries itself can create new forms of digital and healthcare exclusion, which mhealth interventions (using mobile phones as a platform) cannot overcome and potentially accentuate. Mhealth has also been argued to alter the practice of healthcare and patient-physician relationships as well as how bodies and health are being represented. Another widespread concern relates to privacy and data protection, for example in the context of electronic health records.

Studies looking into the perceptions and experiences of primary healthcare professionals using mheath have found that most health care professionals appreciated being connected to their colleagues, however some prefer face to face communication. Some healthcare workers also felt that while reporting was improved and team members who require help or training could be more easily identified, some healthcare professionals did not feel comfortable being monitored continuously. A proportion of healthcare professionals prefer paper reporting. The use of mobile apps may sometimes lead to healthcare professionals spending more time performing additional tasks such as filling out electronic forms and may generate more workload in some cases. Some healthcare professionals also do not feel comfortable with work-related contact from patients/clients outside of business hours (however some professionals did find this useful for emergencies).

Communicating with clients/patients while using a mobile device may need to be considered. A decrease in eye contact and the potential to miss non-verbal cues due to concentrating on a screen while speaking with patients is a potential consideration.

Society and Culture

Healthcare in low- and middle-income countries 

Middle income and especially low-income countries face a plethora of constraints in their healthcare systems. These countries face a severe lack of human and physical resources, as well as some of the largest burdens of disease, extreme poverty, and large population growth rates. Additionally, healthcare access to all reaches of society is generally low in these countries.

According to a World Health Organization (WHO) report from June 2011, higher-income countries show more mHealth activity than do lower-income countries (as consistent with eHealth trends in general). Countries in the European Region are currently the most active and those in the African Region the least active. The WHO report findings also included that mHealth is most easily incorporated into processes and services that historically use voice communication through conventional telephone networks. The report was the result of a mHealth survey module designed by researchers at the Earth Institute's Center for Global Health and Economic Development, Columbia University.

The WHO notes an extreme deficit within the global healthcare workforce. The WHO notes critical healthcare workforce shortages in 57 countries—most of which are characterized as developing countries—and a global deficit of 2.4 million doctors, nurses, and midwives. The WHO, in a study of the healthcare workforce in 12 countries of Africa, finds an average density of physicians, nurses and midwives per 1000 population of 0.64. The density of the same metric is four times as high in the United States, at 2.6.

The burden of disease is additionally much higher in low- and middle-income countries than high-income countries. The burden of disease, measured in disability-adjusted life year (DALY), which can be thought of as a measurement of the gap between current health status and an ideal situation where everyone lives into old age, free of disease and disability, is about five times higher in Africa than in high-income countries. In addition, low- and middle-income countries are forced to face the burdens of both extreme poverty and the growing incidence of chronic diseases, such as diabetes and heart disease, an effect of new-found (relative) affluence.

Considering poor infrastructure and low human resources, the WHO notes that the healthcare workforce in sub-Saharan Africa would need to be scaled up by as much as 140% to attain international health development targets such as those in the Millennium Declaration.

The WHO, in reference to the healthcare condition in sub-Saharan Africa, states:
The problem is so serious that in many instances there is simply not enough human capacity even to absorb, deploy and efficiently use the substantial additional funds that are considered necessary to improve health in these countries.

Mobile technology has made a recent and rapid appearance into low- and middle-income nations. While, in the mHealth field, mobile technology usually refers to mobile phone technology, the entrance of other technologies into these nations to facilitate healthcare are also discussed here.

Health and development 
The link between health and development can be found in three of the Millennium Development Goals (MDGs), as set forth by the United Nations Millennium Declaration in 2000. The MDGs that specifically address health include reducing child mortality; improving maternal health; combating HIV and AIDS, malaria, and other diseases; and increasing access to safe drinking water. A progress report published in 2006 indicates that childhood immunization and deliveries by skilled birth attendants are on the rise, while many regions continue to struggle to achieve reductions in the prevalence of the diseases of poverty including malaria, HIV and AIDS and tuberculosis.

Healthcare in developed countries 
In developed countries, healthcare systems have different policies and goals in relation to the personal and population health care goals.

In the US and EU many patients and consumers use their cell phones and tablets to access health information and look for healthcare services. In parallel the number of mHealth applications grew significantly in the last years.

Doctors, nurses and clinicians use mobile devices to access patient information and other databases and resources.

Technology and market 

Basic SMS functions and real-time voice communication serve as the backbone and the current most common use of mobile phone technology. The broad range of potential benefits to the health sector that the simple functions of mobile phones can provide should not be understated.

The appeal of mobile communication technologies is that they enable communication in motion, allowing individuals to contact each other irrespective of time and place. This is particularly beneficial for work in remote areas where the mobile phone, and now increasingly wireless infrastructure, is able to reach more people, faster. As a result of such technological advances, the capacity for improved access to information and two-way communication becomes more available at the point of need.

Mobile phones 

With the global mobile phone penetration rate drastically increasing over the last decade, mobile phones have made a recent and rapid entrance into many parts of the low- and middle-income world. Improvements in telecommunications technology infrastructure, reduced costs of mobile handsets, and a general increase in non-food expenditure have influenced this trend. Low- and middle-income countries are utilizing mobile phones as "leapfrog technology" (see leapfrogging). That is, mobile phones have allowed many developing countries, even those with relatively poor infrastructure, to bypass 20th century fixed-line technology and jump to modern mobile technology.

The number of global mobile phone subscribers in 2007 was estimated at 3.1 billion of an estimated global population of 6.6 billion (47%). These figures are expected to grow to 4.5 billion by 2012, or a 64.7% mobile penetration rate. The greatest growth is expected in Asia, the Middle East, and Africa. In many countries, the number of mobile phone subscribers has bypassed the number of fixed-line telephones; this is particularly true in developing countries. Globally, there were 4.1 billion mobile phones in use in December 2008. See List of countries by number of mobile phones in use.

While mobile phone penetration rates are on the rise, globally, the growth within countries is not generally evenly distributed. In India, for example, while mobile penetration rates have increased markedly, by far the greatest growth rates are found in urban areas. Mobile penetration, in September 2008, was 66% in urban areas, while only 9.4% in rural areas. The all India average was 28.2% at the same time. So, while mobile phones may have the potential to provide greater healthcare access to a larger portion of a population, there are certainly within-country equity issues to consider.

Mobile phones are spreading because the cost of mobile technology deployment is dropping and people are, on average, getting wealthier in low- and middle-income nations. Vendors, such as Nokia, are developing cheaper infrastructure technologies (CDMA) and cheaper phones (sub $50–100, such as Sun's Java phone). Non-food consumption expenditure is increasing in many parts of the developing world, as disposable income rises, causing a rapid increase in spending on new technology, such as mobile phones. In India, for example, consumers have become and continue to become wealthier. Consumers are shifting their expenditure from necessity to discretionary. For example, on average, 56% of Indian consumers' consumption went towards food in 1995, compared to 42% in 2005. The number is expected to drop to 34% by 2015. That being said, although total share of consumption has declined, total consumption of food and beverages increased 82% from 1985 to 2005, while per-capita consumption of food and beverages increased 24%. Indian consumers are getting wealthier and they are spending more and more, with a greater ability to spend on new technologies.

Smartphones 
From the first quarter of 2015 through the first quarter of 2021, 107,033 mHealth apps in the health and fitness category were available via the Apple Store and Google Play, an increase of 11.37% from the previous quarter. More advanced mobile phone technologies are enabling the potential for further healthcare delivery. Smartphone technologies are now in the hands of a large number of physicians and other healthcare workers in low- and middle-income countries. Although far from ubiquitous, the spread of smartphone technologies opens up doors for mHealth projects such as technology-based diagnosis support, remote diagnostics and telemedicine, preprogrammed daily self-assessment prompts, video or audio clips, web browsing, GPS navigation, access to web-based patient information, post-visit patient surveillance, and decentralized health management information systems (HMIS).

While uptake of smartphone technology by the medical field has grown in low- and middle-income countries, it is worth noting that the capabilities of mobile phones in low- and middle-income countries has not reached the sophistication of those in high-income countries. The infrastructure that enables web browsing, GPS navigation, and email through smartphones is not as well developed in much of the low- and middle-income countries. Increased availability and efficiency in both voice and data-transfer systems in addition to rapid deployment of wireless infrastructure will likely accelerate the deployment of mobile-enabled health systems and services throughout the world.

Other technologies 

Beyond mobile phones, wireless-enabled laptops and specialized health-related software applications are currently being developed, tested, and marketed for use in the mHealth field. Many of these technologies, while having some application to low- and middle-income nations, are developing primarily in high-income countries. However, with broad advocacy campaigns for free and open source software (FOSS), applications are beginning to be tailored for and make inroads in low- and middle-income countries.

Some other mHealth technologies include:

Patient monitoring devices
Mobile telemedicine/telecare devices
Microcomputers
Data collection software
Mobile Operating System Technology
Mobile applications (e.g., gamified/social wellness solutions)
Chatterbots

Mobile device operating system technology

Technologies relate to the operating systems that orchestrate mobile device hardware while maintaining confidentiality, integrity and availability are required to build trust. This may foster greater adoption of mHealth technologies and services, by exploiting lower cost multi purpose mobile devices such as tablets, PCs, and smartphones. Operating systems that control these emerging classes of devices include Google's Android, Apple's iPhone OS, Microsoft's Windows Mobile, and RIM's BlackBerry OS.

Operating systems must be agile and evolve to effectively balance and deliver the desired level of service to an application and end user, while managing display real estate, power consumption and security posture. With advances in capabilities such as integrating voice, video and Web 2.0 collaboration tools into mobile devices, significant benefits can be achieved in the delivery of health care services. New sensor technologies  such as HD video and audio capabilities, accelerometers, GPS, ambient light detectors, barometers and gyroscopes can enhance the methods of describing and studying cases, close to the patient or consumer of the health care service. This could include diagnosis, education, treatment and monitoring.

Air quality sensing technologies

Environmental conditions have a significant impact on public health. Per the World Health Organization, outdoor air pollution accounts for about 1.4% of total mortality. Utilizing Participatory sensing technologies in mobile telephone, public health research can exploit the wide penetration of mobile devices to collect air measurements, which can be utilized to assess the impact of pollution. Projects such as the Urban Atmospheres are utilizing embedded technologies in mobile phones to acquire real time conditions from millions of users mobile phones. By aggregating this data, public health policy shall be able to craft initiatives to mitigate the risk associated with outdoor air pollution.

Data
Data has become an especially important aspect of mHealth. Data collection requires both the collection device (mobile phones, computer, or portable device) and the software that houses the information. Data is primarily focused on visualizing static text but can also extend to interactive decision support algorithms, other visual image information, and also communication capabilities through the integration of e-mail and SMS features. Integrating use of GIS and GPS with mobile technologies adds a geographical mapping component that is able to "tag" voice and data communication to a particular location or series of locations. These combined capabilities have been used for emergency health services as well as for disease surveillance, health facilities and services mapping, and other health-related data collection.

History 
The motivation behind the development of the mHealth field arises from two factors. The first factor concerns the myriad constraints felt by healthcare systems of developing nations. These constraints include high population growth, a high burden of disease prevalence, low health care workforce, large numbers of rural inhabitants, and limited financial resources to support healthcare infrastructure and health information systems. The second factor is the recent rapid rise in mobile phone penetration in developing countries to large segments of the healthcare workforce, as well as the population of a country as a whole. With greater access to mobile phones to all segments of a country, including rural areas, the potential of lowering information and transaction costs in order to deliver healthcare improves.

The combination of these two factors has motivated much discussion of how greater access to mobile phone technology can be leveraged to mitigate the numerous pressures faced by developing countries' healthcare systems.

Research
Emerging trends and areas of interest:
Emergency response systems (e.g., road traffic accidents, emergency obstetric care).
Human resources coordination, management, and supervision.
Mobile synchronous (voice) and asynchronous (SMS) telemedicine diagnostic and decision support to remote clinicians.
Clinician-focused, evidence-based formulary, database and decision support information available at the point of care.
Pharmaceutical supply chain integrity and patient safety systems (e.g. Sproxil and mPedigree).
Clinical care and remote patient monitoring (e.g. Clear Arch Health).
Health extension services.
Inpatient monitoring.
Health services monitoring and reporting.
Health-related mLearning for the general public.
Public health services, for example, tobacco cessation
Mental health promotion and illness prevention 
Training and continuing professional development for health care workers.
Health promotion and community mobilization.
Support of long-term conditions, for example medication reminders and diabetes self-management.
Peer-to-peer personal health management for telemedicine.
Social mobilization for infectious disease prevention.
Surgical follow-up, such as for major joint arthroplasty patients.
Mobile social media for global health personnel; for example, the capacity to facilitate professional connectedness, and to empower health workforce.

According to the Vodafone Group Foundation on February 13, 2008, a partnership for emergency communications was created between the group and United Nations Foundation. Such partnership will increase the effectiveness of the information and communications technology response to major emergencies and disasters around the world.

See also

Health informatics
Health 2.0
Open source software packages for mHealth
Telehealth
Healthcare workforce information systems
Telemedicine service providers

References

Further reading

  
  Describes role of EpiSurveyor mobile data collection software in contributing to the highly successful fight against measles mortality.
 
 
 

   Peer-reviewed journal on mHealth and uHealth (ubiquitous health)
  
 
 
 
 
  Discusses use of handheld electronic data collection in managing public health data and activities.

 
 
 
  Discusses use of EpiSurveyor software in public health monitoring in Africa.

Health informatics
Appropriate technology
Telehealth
Mobile phones
Mobile computers
Medical terminology